Jonas Motiejūnas (born 7 December 1974) is a Lithuanian sprinter. He competed in the men's 400 metres at the 2000 Summer Olympics.

References

1974 births
Living people
Athletes (track and field) at the 2000 Summer Olympics
Lithuanian male sprinters
Olympic athletes of Lithuania
Place of birth missing (living people)